Bliznetsy is a rural locality (a village) in Pekshinskoye Rural Settlement, Petushinsky District, Vladimir Oblast, Russia. The population was 11 as of 2010.

Geography 
Bliznetsy is located 30 km northeast of Petushki (the district's administrative centre) by road. Sukovatovo is the nearest rural locality.

References 

Rural localities in Petushinsky District